The boxing competitions at the 2013 Mediterranean Games in Mersin took place between 21 June and 26 June at the Toroslar Sports Hall. Athletes competed in 10 weight categories. Even though women's boxing has been recently introduced to some multi-sports events, only men's boxing events were held.

80 boxers from eighteen countries participated. All countries won at least one medal except Albania, Cyprus, Lebanon and Syria. Algeria dominated the competition by winning five gold and one bronze medal. Macedonia's Fatlum Zhuta secured first medal for his country at the Mediterranean Games after winning his quarterfinal match on Day 3.

Medal summary

Events

Medal table
Key:

Participating nations
Eighteen Mediterranean nations have registered for boxing competitions.

  Albania
  Algeria
  Bosnia and Herzegovina
  Croatia
  Cyprus
  Egypt
  France
  Greece
  Italy
  Lebanon
  Macedonia
  Montenegro
  Morocco
  Slovenia
  Spain
  Syria
  Tunisia
  Turkey

References

 
2013
Sports at the 2013 Mediterranean Games
2013 in boxing
International boxing competitions hosted by Turkey